Adam Otto Wilhelm Freiherr von Bistram or Adam Ivanovich Bistrom (Russian: Адам Иванович Бистром; 23 October 1774 in Merjama, Kreis Wiek, Governorate of Estonia – 17 October 1828 in Dresden) was a commander in the Imperial Russian Army during the Napoleonic Wars. He was from a Germano-Baltic noble family and his elder brother Karl also fought in the war.

References

External links
https://web.archive.org/web/20160422091700/http://www.museum.ru/1812/persons/slovar/index.html

1774 births
1828 deaths
People from Märjamaa
People from Kreis Wiek
Baltic-German people
Baltic nobility
Russian commanders of the Napoleonic Wars